The Sun Building (also known as the Baltimore Sun Building or American Bank Building) is an historic building, located at 1317 F Street, Northwest, Washington, D.C., in the Downtown Washington, D.C. neighborhood.

History
It was designed by Alfred B. Mullett and constructed from 1885 to 1887, by John H. Howlett.  
It was built for the Washington Bureau of the Baltimore Sun.

The nine story building was served by steam elevators, which were replaced by hydraulics in 1909, and electric elevators in 1922. It was altered, in 1904 by B. Stanley Simmons for the American Bank.
In 1907, the ninth story was added as the Interstate Commerce Commission Hearing Room.

Tenants included the Interstate Commerce Commission, Woodrow Wilson's law firm, Daniel C. Roper, and the Federal Bureau of Investigation.

The Sun Building was added to the National Register of Historic Places on March 27, 1985. Its 2009 property value is $13,931,970.

See also
 Early skyscrapers
 National Register of Historic Places listings in the District of Columbia

References

External links
 
 emporis

Commercial buildings completed in 1887
Bank buildings on the National Register of Historic Places in Washington, D.C.
Skyscraper office buildings in Washington, D.C.
1887 establishments in Washington, D.C.